Bisarjan is a 2012 Bengali drama directed by Suman Mukhopadhyay. The play is based on Rabindranath Tagore's Bisarjan (1890).

Plot 
Tagore's work was on how humans lost out their paradise trying to satisfy a god who wanted for animal sacrifice. Mukhopadhyay, in this play, has interpreted the theme of sacrifice at various levels.
It is a story based around goddess Kali and how the King believes she does not want animal sacrifice. The priest, on the other hand, believes he is considering the goddess a subject of his court that he can control.

Cast 
 Goutam Halder as Raghupati
 Kaushik Sen as Jaisingh– Raghupati's foster son and disciple
 Biplab Bandopadhyay as King Gobindamanikya
 Turna Das as Aparna
 Mishka Halim as Rani Gunabati

References 

2012 plays
Bengali-language plays
Indian plays